John Malcolm McCardell Jr. (born June 17, 1949) is an American historian and academic administrator. On June 17, 2020, he stepped down as the Vice-Chancellor and President of Sewanee: The University of the South, where he will remain a history professor.

Early life
McCardell was born on June 17, 1949 in Maryland. He graduated from Washington and Lee University in 1971. He earned a PhD in History from Harvard University in 1976. For his dissertation, The Idea of a Southern Nation, he was awarded the 1977 Allan Nevins Prize by the Society of American Historians.

Academic career
McCardell joined the History department at Middlebury College in 1976. He served as the university president from 1992 to 2004. An anonymous donor of $50 million in the spring of 2004 asked that Middlebury's science center, Bicentennial Hall, be renamed John M. McCardell Jr. Bicentennial Hall. McCardell taught History at Middlebury College from 2004 to 2010.

McCardell served as Vice-Chancellor of Sewanee: The University of the South from 2010 until June 17, 2020. He continues as a professor of history at the University.

Lowering the drinking age
McCardell is the founder and director of Choose Responsibility, an organization dedicated to exploring and advocating the lowering of the legal drinking age to 18 and issuing drinking learner permits to adults age 18, 19, and 20 in an effort to promote responsible consumption. He authored an op-ed in The New York Times in 2004 saying, "the 21-year-old drinking age is bad social policy and terrible law". He later spearheaded the creation of the Amethyst Initiative, a statement of over 120 college presidents across the United States calling for reconsideration of drinking age laws.

Personal life
McCardell has a wife, Bonnie Greenwald, and two sons.

Bibliography 
 In the Cause of Liberty:How the Civil War Redefined American Ideals edited by William J. Cooper and John M. McCardell Jr. Baton Rouge,LA.:Louisiana State University Press, 2009

References

External links 
 Middlebury College Website
 Vermont youth push to drink earlier
 Choose Responsibility
 

Living people
Presidents of Middlebury College
Sewanee: The University of the South administrators
Washington and Lee University alumni
Johns Hopkins University alumni
Harvard University alumni
Middlebury College faculty
People from Middlebury, Vermont
1949 births